is a public junior college in Tsu, Mie, Japan. It was founded in 1952.

Alumni 
 Tetsuo Morimoto - politician

External links
 Official website 

Educational institutions established in 1952
Public universities in Japan
Universities and colleges in Mie Prefecture
Japanese junior colleges
1952 establishments in Japan